Peace Church Bangladesh or Peace Presbyterian Church in Bangladesh is a  Presbyterian denomination in the country.  The denomination was founded in 2009. Currently it has 13 cell church and 2 preaching fields. One field is in Muslim community the other is in Hindu community. It acknowledge the Apostles Creed and the Westminster Confession.
Peace Church is a member of the World Reformed Fellowship.

References 

Presbyterian denominations in Asia
Members of the World Reformed Fellowship